John Phillips Allcot Bowers (15 May 1854 – 6 January 1926) was Bishop of Thetford in the Church of England in 1903–1926.

John Bowers was born in Portsea, Portsmouth, Hampshire and educated at Magdalen School and St John's College, Cambridge. His first post after ordination was as a Curate at Coggeshall. From 1882 to 1903 he was Domestic Chaplain to the Bishop of Gloucester and went on to be Diocesan Missioner and a Residentiary Canon at Gloucester Cathedral (1890–1902). In January 1902, he was appointed Archdeacon of Gloucester before his appointment as Bishop of Thetford and Archdeacon of Lynn in 1903 which refers to Kings Lynn.

A prominent Freemason, he died in Norwich.

References

1854 births
People educated at Magdalen College School, Oxford
Alumni of St John's College, Cambridge
Archdeacons of Gloucester
Bishops of Thetford
Archdeacons of Lynn
1926 deaths
20th-century Church of England bishops